A connective tissue nevus  may be present at birth or appear within the first few years, is elevated, soft to firm, varying from 0.5 to several centimeters in diameter, and may be grouped, linear, or irregularly distributed.

See also 
 Skin lesion
 List of cutaneous conditions

References

External links 

Dermal and subcutaneous growths